The 1996 Bayern Rundfahrt was the 8th edition of the Bayern Rundfahrt cycle race and was held on 28 May to 2 June 1996. The race started in Rottach-Egern and finished in Burglengenfeld. The race was won by Uwe Peschel.

General classification

References

Bayern-Rundfahrt
1996 in German sport